The Big Head Formation is a formation cropping out in Newfoundland.
It comprises grey-green fine grained seds, and crops out at the foreboding cliffs of Big Head, Placentia Bay.

References

Ediacaran Newfoundland and Labrador